Hapoel Kafr Qasim Shouaa is an Israeli football club based in Kafr Qasim. They are currently in Liga Bet South A division.

History
The club was founded in 2006 and played eight seasons in Liga Gimel, the lowest tier of Israeli football, up until the 2013–14 season, when the club won Liga Gimel Sharon division and were promoted to Liga Bet. At the same season, they faced F.C. Kafr Qasim (played in Liga Alef) in a derby, in the sixth round of the Israel State Cup. Shouaa were defeated by a result of 0–1.

The club finished its first season in Liga Bet in the third place of South A division and qualified for the promotion play-offs, where they lost in the first round to Hapoel Kiryat Ono on penalties, after 2–2 draw in 120 minutes.

Honours

League

Cups

External links
Hapoel Kafr Qasim Shouaa  Israel Football Association

References

Football clubs in Israel
Kafr Qasim Shouaa
Association football clubs established in 2006
2006 establishments in Israel
Arab-Israeli football clubs